Scalicus serrulatus is a species of marine ray-finned fish belonging to the family Peristediidae, the armoured gurnards or armored sea robins. It is found in the Indo-West Pacific where it has been recorded from the Saya de Malha Bank, Andaman Sea, Indonesia, Kyushu-Palau Ridge, Japan and Emperor Seamount Chain.

References 

serrulatus
Animals described in 1898
Taxa named by Alfred William Alcock